Tennesseellum is a genus of sheet weavers that was first described by Alexander Ivanovitch Petrunkevitch in 1925.  it contains only two species, both found in North America, the United States, and on the Marshall Islands: T. formica and T. gollum.

See also
 List of Linyphiidae species (Q–Z)

References

Araneomorphae genera
Fauna of the United States
Linyphiidae
Spiders of North America